Arthur Dare (1 June 1876 – 3 June 1927) was a Guyanese cricketer. He played in ten first-class matches for British Guiana from 1894 to 1900.

See also
 List of Guyanese representative cricketers

References

External links
 

1876 births
1927 deaths
Guyanese cricketers
Guyana cricketers
Sportspeople from Georgetown, Guyana